Turana may refer to:
GAF Turana, an Australian target drone
Melbourne Youth Justice Centre, an Australian detention centre also known as Turana
Turana (ward), an administrative ward in Tanzania
Turana (cricket), a genus of crickets in subfamily Euscyrtinae